Movement of Central African Liberators for Justice (MLCJ) was a rebel group in the Central African Republic led by Abakor Sabone. The group was a splinter group from the Union of Democratic Forces for Unity and was involved in fighting in the Central African Republic Bush War. The groups mainly drew from the Kara ethnic group.

History 
In September 2019 they gained control of Birao after a battle with the FPRC. On 14 October MLCJ took control of Am Dafok. It was recaptured by FPRC on 16 December. On 26 January 2020, the MLCJ attacked Bria, capturing more than 60% of the city after 24 hours of clashes with the FPRC. On 17 February FPRC fighters tried to recapture Birao by attacking local MINUSCA forces. Their attack was repelled and 12 fighters were killed. On 9 March around 100 members of MLCJ fighters participated in RPRC attack on N'Délé. On 29 April, the RPRC and MLCJ attacked a central market in N'Délé killing at least 37 people. On 4 December 2022 official dissolution of the group was signed in Bangui.

References

Rebel groups in the Central African Republic
Central African Republic Bush War